The following highways are numbered 16A:

Canada
 Alberta Highway 16A
 Manitoba Highway 16A
 Prince Edward Island Route 16A
 Saskatchewan Highway 16A

United States
 U.S. Route 16A
 County Road 16A (Clay County, Florida)
 County Road 16A (St. Johns County, Florida)
 Nebraska Spur 16A
 New Hampshire Route 16A
 New York State Route 16A (former)
 Secondary State Highway 16A (Washington)